{{DISPLAYTITLE:C6H12N2}}
The molecular formula C6H12N2 (molar mass: 112.17 g/mol, exact mass: 112.1000 u) may refer to:

 Acetone azine
 DABCO, or 1,4-diazabicyclo[2.2.2]octane